Morihiko (written: 守彦) is a masculine Japanese given name. Notable people with the name include:

, Japanese politician
Morihiko Nakahara (born 1975), Japanese conductor
, Japanese mathematician

Japanese masculine given names